Nová Lhota is a municipality and village in Hodonín District in the South Moravian Region of the Czech Republic. It has about 600 inhabitants.

Administrative parts
The village of Vápenky is an administrative part of Nová Lhota.

References

Villages in Hodonín District
Horňácko